= Kids' Door =

Japanese non-profit for education

Kids' Door is a Japanese non-profit organization that provides free education to children from primary school to secondary school that are on welfare or are from single parent families. It also provides food for the children that cannot purchase food with their own money. In addition, Kids' Door advises families that have poor children on how to get them to a post-secondary school. It was founded by Yumiko Watanabe in 2007. Kids' Door primarily serves children in Tokyo. The organization lobbies for an increase in the allowance for child support.

The children at Kids' Door are taught by volunteers, which are both college students and adults, on the weekends and after school.
